Rudolph "Matt" Matthews (born November 7, 1945) is an American former handball player who competed in the 1972 Summer Olympics.

He was born in Woodville, Mississippi.

In 1972, he was part of the American team which finished 14th in the Olympic tournament. He played all five matches and scored ten goals.

External links
 profile

1945 births
Living people
People from Woodville, Mississippi
American male handball players
Olympic handball players of the United States
Handball players at the 1972 Summer Olympics